The contraforte is a proprietary instrument with a range similar to the contrabassoon produced by Benedikt Eppelsheim and Guntram Wolf. It is intended to have improved dynamics and intonation over the distinctive but sometimes reticent sound of the conventional contrabassoon.  The contraforte uses a different and wider bore than the contrabassoon to produce a distinct tone; the sound is more even in strength and intonation across registers, remaining quite strong into the high register, unlike a contrabassoon. Also, it lacks the distinct "rattle" of a contrabassoon, although appropriate reed design can replicate this effect where desired.

Wolf and Eppelsheim developed an accurate bore taper and precise keyworks in order to simplify fingerings in spite of the instrument's large size.

In October 2010, Lewis Lipnick, contrabassoonist for the National Symphony Orchestra in Washington, DC, played it in a performance of Beethoven's Symphony No. 9. According to Lipnick, the other members of the orchestra, who used to make jokes about the sound of his old contrabassoon, praised the sound of the contraforte. As the soloist of the Helsinki Philharmonic Orchestra in February 2012, Lipnick also performed Kalevi Aho's extensive Contrabassoon Concerto on the contraforte, and as a solo instrument it proved  to be superior to the traditional contrabassoon, because of its very wide dynamic range and clear, focused intonation. In September 2021, Georg Friedrich Haas'  concertante symphonic poem for violin, contraforte and orchestra was premiered during the annual Beethovenfest Bonn. The part of the contraforte was played by Lorelei Dowling, a member of Klangforum Wien, who is conducting her artistic research at the University of Music and Performing Arts Graz on the question, "How can the kontraforte be exploited in the colour palette of the 21st century ensemble writing".

Technical specifications 
The contraforte has many technical aspects that have not been associated with instruments like the bassoon and contrabassoon.

The contraforte has a written range from A1 to G5 (in scientific pitch notation), which sounds as A0 to G4.
Large toneholes allow for a free response and a very large dynamical range.
The pivot screws lie in synthetic sleeves for silent key actions, and push rods make for easy key action with low friction.
The half-hole mechanism provides a clean, silent octave for F3 and G3.  There are also well-built automatic octave keys from notes A3 to F4.

References

External links
Contraforte page on Benedikt Eppelsheim's web site, includes recordings.
Contraforte page on Guntram Wolf's web site. Retrieved 23 July 2022.
David Angus, member of the New Zealand Symphony Orchestra, presents the contraforte. Retrieved 23 July 2022.

Images 
Contraforte, pictured with a B flat Tubax

Double-reed instruments
Contrabass instruments